Abbia is an African game of chance among Cameroon's Beti people.  The game is played using nutshells, or the carved fruit of a highly poisonous tree. Gambling chips made from stone are exchanged during the process.
The game was played by men who sat in a circle around a plate-shaped woven basket and placed their carved stones in the basket.
This involves undecorated discs, sa, cut from the peel of the calabash, the outer shell.

Sources 

Cameroonian culture
African games